The 1941 West Virginia Mountaineers football team was an American football team that represented West Virginia University as an independent during the 1941 college football season. In its second season under head coach Bill Kern, the team compiled a 4–6 record and was outscored by a total of 126 to 85. The team played its home games at Mountaineer Field in Morgantown, West Virginia. Henry Goodman was the team captain.

Schedule

References

West Virginia
West Virginia Mountaineers football seasons
West Virginia Mountaineers football